Events from the year 2017 in Kazakhstan

Incumbents 
 President: Nursultan Nazarbayev

 
Years of the 21st century in Kazakhstan
Kazakhstan
Kazakhstan
Kazakhstan
2010s in Kazakhstan